Shiffner is a surname. Notable persons with the surname include:

 George Shiffner (1762–1842), British politician
 Matthew Shiffner ( 1690–1756), Russian-born merchant of German Baltic origins

See also
 Shiffner baronets
 Shoffner